Chrysorithrum is a genus of moths of the family Noctuidae.

Species
 Chrysorithrum amata Bremer & Grey, 1853
 Chrysorithrum flavomaculata Bremer, 1861

References
 Chrysorithrum at Markku Savela's Lepidoptera and Some Other Life Forms
 Natural History Museum Lepidoptera genus database

Calpinae